Efren Montes Reyes Jr. (born June 25, 1959) is a Filipino actor known for his last leading roles in Tapos Na ang Lahi Mo, Hadji Djakiri in 1990 and Nestor Solis in 1996.

Early life
Reyes was born on June 25, 1959, in Baguio, Philippines, he is a fourth generation artist being the son of actor, writer, director and film producer of the late Efren Reyes Sr. and actress, director and film producer Virginia Montes. He is the brother of actress, Cristina Reyes. He is the nephew of actors Johnny Reyes and Tessie Quintana. He is the grandson of writer Pedrito Reyes. He is the great grandson of playwright Severino Reyes who is also known as "Lola Basyang" And is called "the Father of Philippine Sarsuela. Reyes was first introduced as a child actor in the movie Eskinita 29 in 1968, then later he became an action star in the 1980s, and then took roles as main villain in 1989 up to the present in Philippine films and television series.

Filmography

Film
Eskinita 29 (1967)
Siga (1980)
Kaliwete Brothers (1980)
Over My Dead Body (1983)
Digmaan sa Pagitan ng Langit at Lupa (1984)
Pepeng Karbin (1984)
Operation: Central Luzon (1985)
Isusumpa Mo ang Araw Nang Isilang Ka (1985)
Gabi Na, Kumander (1986)
Mula Paa Hanggang Ulo (1989)
Tatak ng Isang Api (1989)
Delima Gang (1989)
Bala at Rosaryo (1990)
Angel Molave (1991)
Tapos Na ang Lahi Mo, Hadji Djakiri (1990)
Kaaway ng Batas (1990)
Walang Piring ang Katarungan (1990)
Sagad Hanggang Buto (1991)
Sgt. Patalinhug (1991)
Kung Patatawarin Ka ng Bala Ko (1991)
Sgt. Ernesto Baliola: Tinik sa Batas (1992)
Basagulero (1992)
Totoy Guwapo Alyas Kanto Boy (1992)
Lakay (1992)
Tondo, Libingan ng Mga Siga (1992)
Lt. Napoleon Velasco, Alyas Kumander Kalbo (1993)
Alejandro "Diablo" Malubay (1993)
Dodong Armado (1993)
Geron Olivar (1993)
Macario Durano (1994)
Nagkataon, Nagkatagpo (1994)
Megamol (1994)
Ka Hector (1994)
Nestor Solis, Hari ng Oxo (1995)
Judge Maximiano Asuncion: Hukom Bitay (1995)
Urban Rangers (1995)
Medrano
Hawak Ko Buhay Mo (1997)
Ang Babae sa Bintana (1998)
Isprikitik: Walastik Kung Pumitik (1999)
Alyas Pogi: Ang Pagbabalik (1999)
Tunay Na Tunay: Gets Mo? Gets Ko! (2000)
Palaban (2000)
Bukas, Babaha ng Dugo (2001)
Mano Po 2: My Home (2003)
Anak ng Kumander (2008)
Father Jejemon (2010)
Badil (2013)
Raketeros (2013)
Muslim Magnum .357: To Serve and Protect (2014)
Da Possessed (2014)
Ang Bagong Dugo (2014)
Kid Kulafu (2015)
Durugin ang Droga (2017)
The Lookout (2018)
Bato: The General Ronald dela Rosa Story (Regal Entertainment, 2019)

As writer
Sa Iyo ang Itaas, sa Akin ang Ibaba ng Bahay (1997)
Tatapatan Ko ang Lakas Mo (1999)
Pasasabugin Ko ang Mundo Mo (2000)

As director
Sa Iyo ang Itaas, sa Akin ang Ibaba ng Bahay (1997)

Television
Lovingly Yours (1984-1996)
Regal Shockers The Series (1985)
Sic O Clock News (1986-1989)
John En Marsha The Series (1987-1990) Guest
Ok Ka Fairy Ko (1987-1995) Guest
Palibhasa Lalake (1987-1998) Guest
Home Along Da Riles (1992-2003) Guest
Boracay (1993) Guest
Cebu (1993) Guest
GMA Telecine Specials (1993)
Bisperas ng Kasaysayan (1994)
Davao: Ang Gintong Pag Asa (1994) Guest
Tropang Trumpo (1995-1998) Guest
Coney Reyes On Camera (1995-1998) Various 
The Calvento Files The Series (1997-1998) Various
Paraiso (1997-1998) Various
Mula Sa Puso (1997-1999) Ysmael Matias
Maynila (1999–present) Various 
Codename: Verano (2000) Guest
Bubble Gang (2000) Various 
Tabing Ilog (1999–2003)
Kasangga (2001) Various
Sa Puso Ko, Iingatan Ka (2001) Mr. Tordesillas
Bituin (2002) Angel
Klassmeyts (2002-2003) Guest
Kaya Ni Mister, Kaya Ni Misis (2003) Guest
Home Along Da Airport (2003) Guest
Barya (2004) TV episode Mark Bautista's Father
Spirits (2004–2005) Chief Jaylo
Quizon Avenue (2005-2006) Guest
Goin Bulilit (2005-2019) Guest
Baywalk Drama Special (2005-2010)
Mga Anghel na Walang Langit (2005-2006)
Margarita (2007) Carding
Love Spell (1 episode, 2007)
Hairy Harry (2007)
Magpakailanman (2008) Various
Codename Asero (2008) Guest
May Bukas Pa (2009)
Bulaklak (2009) TV episode
Dahil May Isang Ikaw Guido (Ella's Kidnapping 2009)
Maalaala Mo Kaya Lina's Husband (2 episodes, 2009)
Tayong Dalawa (2009) Ka Doroy
Tsinelas (2009) TV episode Lina's Husband
Claudine (2010)
Spooky Nights Presents (2011-2012) Various 
Wagas (2012-2019) Various 
Puntod (2013) TV episode Merto
It's Showtime (2012) Guest/Judge
Maalaala Mo Kaya (2013) Merto
Kailangan Ko'y Ikaw (2013) Ernesto Cruz
Little Champ (2013) Mr. Salacay
Tunay Na Buhay (2014) Guest Himself Featured
Imbestigador (2015) Various 
Sabado Badoo (2015) Cameo Footage Featured 
Tubig at Langis (2016) Nestor Samaniego
FPJ's Ang Probinsyano (2016) Apollo Magat
Ipaglaban Mo! (2017)
Dear Uge (2017) Various
Los Bastardos (2018) Robert "Bert" Esperanza
Wansapanataym (2018) Various 
Daig Kayo Ng Lola Ko (2018) Various
 Pepito Manaloto (2019) Guest
Banana Sundae (2019) Guest
 A Soldier's Heart (2020)

Awards

FAMAS Awards
1990 Nominated for Best Supporting Actor for: Delima Gang (1989)
1991 Nominated for Best Supporting Actor for: Angel Molave (1990)

Gawad Urian Awards
1990 Nominated for Best Supporting Actor for: Tatak ng Isang Api (1989)
1999 Nominated for Best Supporting Actor for: Ang Babae sa Bintana (1998)

References

External links

1959 births
Living people
20th-century Filipino male actors
21st-century Filipino male actors
Filipino actors of Chinese descent
Filipino male comedians
Filipino male film actors
Filipino male television actors
Filipino people of Chinese descent
Filipino television personalities
Male actors from Metro Manila
Male actors of Chinese descent
People from Manila
Efren Junior